The 1982–83 South Pacific cyclone season was one of the most active and longest South Pacific tropical cyclone seasons on record, with 16 tropical cyclones occurring within the South Pacific basin between 160°E and 120°W. During the season tropical cyclones were monitored by the meteorological services of Australia, Fiji, French Polynesia and New Zealand. The United States Armed Forces through the Joint Typhoon Warning Center (JTWC) and Naval Pacific Meteorology and Oceanography Center (NPMOC), also monitored the basin and issued unofficial warnings for American interests. The first tropical cyclone of the season developed a day before the season officially began on October 30, while the last tropical cyclone of the season dissipated on May 16. Most of the activity during the season occurred within the central and eastern parts of the basin with French Polynesia affected by several systems.


Seasonal summary 

The 1982–83 season was one of the most active and longest South Pacific tropical cyclone seasons on record, with fourteen tropical cyclones and nine severe tropical cyclones occurring within the South Pacific basin between 160°E and 120°W. During the season, tropical cyclones were primarily monitored by the Fiji Meteorological Service, which issued high seas and tropical cyclone warnings for the region between the Equator and 25°S, 160°E and 140°W. Tropical cyclones that moved below 25S were monitored by the New Zealand Meteorological Service (NZMS), while those that were located to the west of 160E were monitored by the Australian Bureau of Meteorology as a part of the Australian region. During the season, several tropical cyclones formed to the east of the International Dateline and out towards 120°W, which caused significant problems for the FMS, as the eastern edge of its satellite coverage was restricted to around 155°W. As a result, the FMS were dependent on data from other weather services including the United States Joint Typhoon Warning Centre, the Naval Western Oceanographic Centre, Central Pacific Hurricane Center as well as the Tahiti Meteorological Services. The NZMS also had to take over Fiji's regional responsibilities for a few days, while Severe Tropical Cyclone Oscar impacted Fiji and caused a communications outage.

The season was characterised by a very strong El Niño event, which resulted in eleven tropical cyclones occurring to the east of the International Dateline. Five of these tropical cyclones went on to affect the island nation of French Polynesia, which it was thought had not been affected by a tropical cyclone since another very strong El Niño episode in 1905–06.

During the season, ten of the fourteen tropical cyclones observed to the east of 160 E were severe tropical cyclones, with 5 of them occurring in the French Polynesia region which represented one more than was experienced in the same area over the previous 13 seasons. Damage from the storms in French Polynesia was estimated at F16 billion (US$100 million).

After the season had officially ended during April 30, meteorologists at the University of Hawaii identified that two tropical depressions developed on May 11 and May 16.

The first tropical disturbance was first by Honolulu on October 30

Systems

Tropical Cyclone Joti 

Over the next day, the disturbance gradually developed further, as its outflow increased and atmospheric convection surrounding the system organized. The disturbance was subsequently named Joti at 00:00 UTC on November 1, by the FMS as it had developed into a tropical cyclone. As a result, this made Joti one of the earliest tropical cyclones ever recorded within the basin. After it was named, Joti continued to develop as it completed a cyclonic loop, before it started to move south-westwards towards Vanuatu during November 2.

During that day the system started to move towards the west-south-west and made landfall on the northern Espiritu Santo. After the system had moved into the Coral Sea, it gradually weakened and turned towards the south-southwest, before it degenerated into a depression during November 7. Within northern Vanuatu, Joti damaged houses, gardens and fruit trees.

Tropical Cyclone Kina 

The system that was to become Tropical Cyclone Kina was first noted on November 6, while it was located just to the east of Tuvalu. Over the next few days the system moved south-westwards and gradually developed further, before the JTWC reported that the system had developed into a tropical cyclone, with peak 1-minute sustained winds of  during November 10. During that day the FMS also reported that the system had developed into a Category 1 tropical cyclone on the Australian Scale and named it Kina. The FMS subsequently estimated during the next day that the system had reached its peak intensity, with 10-minute sustained winds of  during November 11. Later that day the system's upper-level circulation became sheared off from its lower and moved southwards away from it. The degenerating system subsequently passed to the west of Fiji during November 13, before it was last noted during November 16, as it passed over the island of Efate in Vanuatu but no damage was reported. The system caused strong winds and rough seas on Viti Levu and in the Yasawas and Mamanutha group of islands. Tourists on the Blue Lagoon Cruise in the Yasawas were forced to take shelter from Kina, while 18 people on another boat were temporarily listed as missing as they took shelter.

Tropical Cyclone Lisa 

During December 10, a shallow tropical depression formed to the west of the Northern Cook Island of Penrhyn and started to move south-eastwards towards French Polynesia. Over the next couple of days, the system gradually developed further before the FMS reported that the system had developed into a tropical cyclone and named it Lisa during December 12.
During that day, gale-force winds were observed on Bora Bora before the system caused gas it passed to

Severe Tropical Cyclone Mark 

Mark existed from January 20 to February 1.

Severe Tropical Cyclone Nano 

Nano existed from January 21 to January 29.

Severe Tropical Cyclone Nisha-Orama 

During February 13, a depression developed just to the north of the Marquesas Islands and started moving south-westwards. Over the next four days the system maintained its intensity, before it made a sharp eastwards turn and started to develop further. The system subsequently moved in a counter clockwise loop, which allowed it to develop further and it was declared to be a tropical cyclone and named Nisha by the FMS during February 22. However, by the time Fiji had named it Nisha, the Tahiti Meteorological Service had named it Orama, which was retained in order to save any confusion to the local public. Over the next day, the system started to move south-westwards, while it rapidly intensified, with the FMS estimating 10-minute sustained wind-speeds of  during February 24. During that day the system sharply turned south-eastwards and started to gradually weaken, before it was last noted during February 28, as it moved out of the FMS's area of responsibility, while equivalent to a modern-day category 1 tropical cyclone. The Tuamotu Archipelago was the worst hit area with around 30 of its Atolls, either seriously damaged or destroyed with a damage total of around US$1.7 million reported in two villages on Rangiroa.

Severe Tropical Cyclone Oscar 

Oscar existed from February 23 to March 6. The system formed as a shallow depression north of Suva and developed and intensified as it moved westwards, strengthening on February 27 to a Category 3 Severe Tropical Cyclone, on the modern day Australian tropical cyclone intensity scale. It then moved south-east towards Fiji, becoming one of the worst tropical cyclones to affect the country. It caused nine deaths and US$130 million in damages. As a result of the impact caused the name Oscar was retired, from the list of tropical cyclone names for the region.

Tropical Cyclone Prema 

During February 25, a depression developed within a trough of low pressure, to the south-west of Manihiki in the Northern Cook Islands. After it had been named: Prema moved south-eastwards and started to gradually weaken, before it degenerated into a depression during February 27. The remnants of Prema were subsequently monitored over the next few days, as they moved towards and through French Polynesia, before they were last noted during March 6. Prema brought strong to gale-force winds and high seas to the Northern Cook Islands of Penrhyn, Manihiki, Rakahanga and Pukapula. On the atoll of Manihiki, the high seas reached the settlement, with minor damage to coconut trees reported as a result. Gale-force winds caused some serious damage to a wharf, on the atoll of Penhryn. Heavy rain and gale-force winds off , caused minor damage to French Polynesia's Leeward and Society Islands.

Severe Tropical Cyclone Rewa 

During that day, the system started to rapidly develop further as it moved and was named Rewa, as it had developed into a Category 1 tropical cyclone.

Rewa exacerbated the destruction caused by Severe Tropical Cyclone Nisha/Orama earlier in the season and destroyed more than 200 houses.

Tropical Cyclone Saba 

Saba existed from March 20 to March 25. It sustained winds of 65 mph on the Australian scale, and it affected the Pitcairn Islands.

Severe Tropical Cyclone Sarah 

The system subsequently gradually deepened as it moved south-eastwards and passed to the west of the island, before it was named Sarah by the FMS during March 24, after it had developed into a tropical cyclone. The JTWC subsequently initiated advisories on the system and designated it as Tropical Cyclone 18P.

Severe Tropical Cyclone Tomasi 

The depression was subsequently named Tomasi by the FMS during March 29, after it had developed into a Category 1 tropical cyclone on the Australian scale. After the system was named, Tomasi went through a period of rapid intensification, with an eye appearing on visible satellite imagery during that day. It was also classified as a Category 3 severe tropical cyclone, before a tropical cyclone alert was issued by the FMS for Niue at around 23:08 UTC (11:08 FST, March 30).

During the next day, Tomasi continued to intensify and move south-westwards, while the alert for Niue was upgraded to a gale warning. During April 2, the system started to rapidly weaken, with its high clouds being sheared away, before it degenerated into a mid latitude depression. Tomasi remnants moved towards the south-southeast, before it was last noted during April 5. Some minor damage to vegetation was reported in Niue, as a result of Tomasi.

Severe Tropical Cyclone Veena 

Veena existed from April 8 to April 14.

Severe Tropical Cyclone William 

William existed from April 15 to April 23. William was one of the most northeasterly forming cyclones in the basin's history.

Seasonal effects 

|-
| Joti ||  || bgcolor=#|Category 2 tropical cyclone || bgcolor=#| || bgcolor=#| || Vanuatu || Minor || None ||
|-
| Kina ||  || bgcolor=#|Category 1 tropical cyclone || bgcolor=#| || bgcolor=#| || None || None || None ||
|-
| Lisa ||  || bgcolor=#|Category 2 tropical cyclone || bgcolor=#| || bgcolor=#| || Cook Islands, French Polynesia || || 2 ||
|-
| Mark ||  || bgcolor=#|Category 3 severe tropical cyclone || bgcolor=#| || bgcolor=#| || Fiji, Tonga || || ||
|-
| Nano ||  || bgcolor=#|Category 3 severe tropical cyclone || bgcolor=#| || bgcolor=#| || French Polynesia || None || ||
|-
| Nisha-Orama ||  || bgcolor=#|Category 4 severe tropical cyclone || bgcolor=#| || bgcolor=#| || French Polynesia ||  ||  ||
|-
| Oscar ||  || bgcolor=#|Category 4 severe tropical cyclone || bgcolor=#| || bgcolor=#| || Fiji ||  || 9 ||
|-
| Prema ||  || bgcolor=#|Category 1 tropical cyclone || bgcolor=#| || bgcolor=#| || Cook Islands, French Polynesia || Minor || None ||
|-
| Rewa ||  || bgcolor=#|Category 4 severe tropical cyclone || bgcolor=#| || bgcolor=#| || French Polynesia || || 5 ||
|-
| Saba ||  || bgcolor=#|Category 2 tropical cyclone || bgcolor=#| || bgcolor=#| || French Polynesia, Pitcairn Island || || ||
|-
| Sarah ||  || bgcolor=#|Category 4 severe tropical cyclone || bgcolor=#| || bgcolor=#| || Fiji || || None ||
|-
| Tomasi ||  || bgcolor=#|Category 4 severe tropical cyclone || bgcolor=#| || bgcolor=#| || Cook Islands, Niue || Minor || None ||
|-
| Veena ||  || bgcolor=#|Category 4 severe tropical cyclone || bgcolor=#| || bgcolor=#| || French Polynesia || || 1 ||
|-
| William ||  || bgcolor=#|Category 3 severe tropical cyclone || bgcolor=#| || bgcolor=#| || French Polynesia || || 1 ||
|-
| TD ||  || bgcolor=#| || bgcolor=#| || bgcolor=#| || None || None || None ||
|-
| TD ||  || bgcolor=#| || bgcolor=#| || bgcolor=#| || None || None || None ||
|-

See also 
 1997–98 South Pacific cyclone season
 2014–15 South Pacific cyclone season
 List of off-season South Pacific tropical cyclones

References

External links 

 
South Pacific cyclone seasons
Articles which contain graphical timelines
1982 SPAC
1982 SPAC